Oaks, Quercus species, are used as food plants by the larvae of a large number of Lepidoptera species:

Monophagous
Species which feed exclusively on Quercus

 Bucculatricidae
 Several Bucculatrix leaf-miner species:
 B. ainsliella
 B. albertiella
 B. amiculella
 B. cerina
 B. domicola – only on pin oak (Q. palustris)
 B. litigiosella
 B. luteella – only on white oak (Q. alba)
 B. ochrisuffusa – only on white oak (Q. alba)
 B. recognita – only on bur oak (Q. macrocarpa)
 B. zophopasta – only on Garry oak (Q. garryana)
 Gelechiidae
Several Chionodes species:
C. acrina
 C. bicostomaculella
 C. chrysopyla
 C. formosella – only on northern red oak (Q. rubra) and some others
 C. fuscomaculella
 C. gilvomaculella
 C. pereyra
 C. petalumensis – only on Garry oak (Q. garryana) and valley oak (Q. lobata)
 C. raspyon
 C. trichostola
 C. trophella
 C. vanduzeei – only on coast live oak (Q. agrifolia)
 Coleophoridae
 Several Coleophora case-bearer species:
 C. bipennella
 C. discostriata
 C. levantis
 C. melanograpta
 C. quercicola – only on Mongolian oak (Q. mongolica)
 C. querciella
 Geometridae
 Comibaena bajularia (blotched emerald)
Lycaenidae
Neozephyrus quercus
 Noctuidae
 Catocala amica (girlfriend underwing) – possibly restricted to section Lobatae and section Quercus
 Notodontidae
 Phryganidia californica (California oak moth) – only on coast live oak (Q. agrifolia) and some others

Polyphagous
Species which feed on Quercus and other plants

 Arctiidae
 Eilema lurideola (common footman)
 Spilosoma luteum (buff ermine)
 Bucculatricidae
 Several Bucculatrix leaf-miner species:
 B. packardella
 B. quinquenotella – recorded on northern red oak (Q. rubra)
 B. trifasciella – recorded on northern red oak (Q. rubra)
 B. ulmella
 Coleophoridae
 Several Coleophora case-bearer species:
 C. albovanescens
 C. anatipennella
 C. atromarginata
 C. currucipennella
 C. flavipennella
 C. ibipennella
 C. lutipennella
 C. palliatella
 C. serratella – recorded on interior live oak (Q. wislizenii)
 Drepanidae
 Drepana binaria (oak hook-tip)
 Gelechiidae
 Chionodes occidentella
 Geometridae
 Agriopis marginaria (dotted border)
 Alcis repandata (mottled beauty)
 Cabera pusaria (common white wave)
 Campaea margaritata (light emerald)
 Campaea perlata (pale beauty)
 Colotois pennaria (feathered thorn)
 Ectropis crepuscularia (engrailed)
 Epirrita autumnata (autumnal moth)
 Epirrita christyi (pale November moth)
 Epirrita dilutata (November moth)
 Erannis defoliaria (mottled umber)
 Hemithea aestivaria (common emerald)
 Idaea biselata (small fan-footed wave)
 Odontopera bidentata (scalloped hazel)
 Operophtera brumata (winter moth)
 Selenia tetralunaria (purple thorn)
 Hepialidae
 Endoclita excrescens
 Endoclita sinensis
 Hepialus humuli (ghost moth)
 Lymantriidae
 Euproctis chrysorrhoea (brown-tail)
 Euproctis similis (yellow-tail)
 Lymantria dispar (gypsy moth)
 Noctuidae
 Acronicta aceris (sycamore) – recorded on pedunculate oak (Q. robur)
 Acronicta leporina (miller)
 Acronicta psi (grey dagger)
 Agrotis exclamationis (heart and dart)
 Amphipyra berbera (Svensson's copper underwing)
 Amphipyra pyramidea (copper underwing)
 Amphipyra tragopoginis (mouse moth)
 Catocala delilah (Delilah underwing) – recorded on bur oak (Q. macrocarpa), Gambel oak (Q. gambeli) and perhaps others
 Cosmia trapezina (dun-bar)
 Euplexia lucipara (small angle shades)
 Eupsilia transversa (satellite)
 Melanchra persicariae (dot moth) – recorded on holm oak (Q. ilex)
 Orthosia cerasi (common Quaker)
 Orthosia gothica (Hebrew character)
 Panolis flammea (pine beauty)
 Phlogophora meticulosa (angle shades)
 Xestia xanthographa (square-spot rustic)
 Notodontidae
 Nadata gibbosa (rough prominent)
 Phalera bucephala (buff-tip)
 Ptilodon capucina (coxcomb prominent) – recorded on pedunculate oak (Q. robur)
 Oecophoridae
 Esperia oliviella – recorded in dead twigs of oaks
 Pyralidae
 Endotricha flammealis
 Saturniidae
 Automeris io (Io moth)
 Pavonia pavonia (emperor moth)
 Sphingidae
 Mimas tiliae (lime hawk-moth)
 Thaumetopoeidae
 Thaumetopoea processionea (oak processionary)
 Tortricidae
 Syndemis musculana

References

External links

Oaks
Lepidoptera